Waimata is a rural community in the Hauraki District and Waikato region of New Zealand's North Island.

The population of Waimata and its surrounds was 138 people in 54 households in the 2013 New Zealand census.

Education

References

Hauraki District
Populated places in Waikato